The Japan women's national under-16 and under-17 basketball team is the national basketball team of Japan  and is administered by the Japan Basketball Association. 

It represents the country in international under-16 and under-17 (under age 16 and under age 17) women's basketball competitions.

At the 2017 FIBA Under-16 Women's Asian Championship in India, Japan finished runner-up only to Australia, which Japan lost by 1 point.

World Cup record

See also
Japan women's national basketball team
Japan women's national under-19 basketball team
Japan men's national under-17 basketball team

References

External links

Women's national under-17 basketball teams
Basketball